Captain Frank Ault, USN (Ret) (1922 – August 25, 2006) was a United States Naval officer. He is best remembered for the classified study he led in 1968 that led to the creation of the Navy Fighter Weapons School, or TOPGUN. Disturbed over less than expected performance of Navy fighters against the North Vietnamese MiGs in the first stage of the Vietnam War 1965-1968 in which the exchange ratio was at best 2.5:1, Ault was directed by Adm. Tom Moorer, the Chief of Naval Operations (CNO) to conduct a sweeping review of aircraft, aircrew, organizational, training and missile performance and make recommendations for improvements. The official title of the report was Air-to-Air Missile System Capability Review, but it quickly became known simply as the Ault Report.  Ault Field located at NAS Whidbey Island in Oak Harbor, WA is not named for him, rather, it is named for the Lexington's Air Group Commander who died at the battle of Coral Sea in 1942.  Ironically, Frank Ault would command the carrier that bore the name of that battle, (CVA-43).  The auditorium at NAS Fallon Nevada Naval Strike and Air Warfare Center is named for Captain Frank Ault.

References
Air-to-Air Missile System Capability Review (1969) .
Lon Nordeen (1985) Air Warfare in the Missile Age, Smithsonian Press

1922 births
2006 deaths
United States Navy captains